Dalavanur Sathrumalleswaram Pallava rockcut temple is situated between Gingee and Mandagapattu in Tamil Nadu. Above the cave temple there are Jain rockbed resembles. It is an Archaeological Survey of India site.

References

Hindu temples in Viluppuram district